ÉrIn Geraghty (born 1955) is an Irish film, television and stage actress whose career has spanned 50 years.

Life and career
After a brief career as a child model in the 1960s Geraghty attended the Italia Conti Academy of Theatre Arts (1967–69) before studying at Corona Academy of Theatre Arts (1969-1972). Geraghty made her first television appearances in 1968 as Michele in "The Corpse Can't Play" episode of Late Night Horror and as Sarah in the now lost "The Problem of Thor Bridge" episode of Sherlock Holmes starring Peter Cushing in the title role.

Other television appearances include Sal Turner in Z-Cars (1971); Jacquetta in Whack-O! (1972); Maureen Morahan in Angels (Series 1-3, 1975–76); Margaret MacAmnay in Churchill's People (1975); Florrie Bagster  in Clayhanger (1976); Jane in Raffles (1979); Margaret Locke in Fox (1980); Iris in the TV biopic Florence Nightingale (1985); Sandra Marsh in EastEnders (1986); Mistress Goody the Hag in Knightmare (1990); Annie Jones in The Bill (1993); Vicar's wife in Last of the Summer Wine (2008); Nurse Scott in Mistresses (2010); Gail in Birds of a Feather (2015); and  Diane Johnson in Yellow Jacket (2017) and Laura Evans in Doctors (2020).

Her film roles include the young Beatrix Potter in The Tales of Beatrix Potter (1971), Ducky in The Bunny Caper aka Sex Play (1974), and Joan in That'll Be the Day (1973).

Geraghty's stage career includes a wide range of roles, with Cam Fuller of The StarPhoenix describing her as "a renowned British actress with credits in everything from the Royal Shakespeare Company to Coronation Street". Geraghty's performance in A Time to Go Walking earned her an award for best female performer at the 2000 Orlando International Fringe Theater Festival. In 2014 Geraghty played Ellen Creed in the Victorian melodrama Ladies in Retirement at the Grand Theatre, Wolverhampton. In 2016 she played Annie Beck in a national tour of a stage adaptation of the popular television series Heartbeat; while in October that year she appeared opposite her husband Paul Lavers in a production of Bedroom Farce at the Gordon Craig Theatre in Stevenage. In 2017 she played Janet Widdington in Ladies in Lavender at the Theatre Royal, Windsor. The next year she played Nanny Price in Small Wonders at the Bernie Grant Arts Centre. Other stage roles include Mistress Ford in The Merry Wives of Windsor and Nurse in Romeo and Juliet.

References

External links

Érin Geraghty's personal website

1955 births
Living people
Irish stage actresses
Irish television actresses
Irish film actresses
Alumni of the Italia Conti Academy of Theatre Arts
Irish Shakespearean actresses